is a 1964 Japanese New Wave drama directed by Hiroshi Teshigahara, starring Eiji Okada as an entomologist searching for insects and Kyōko Kishida as the titular woman. It received positive critical reviews and was nominated for two Academy Awards. The screenplay for the film was adapted by Kōbō Abe from his 1962 novel.

Plot

School teacher and amateur entomologist Niki Junpei leaves Tokyo on a beach expedition to collect tiger beetles and other insects that live in sandy soil. After a long day of searching, Junpei misses the last bus ride back to town. A village elder and some of his fellow local villagers suggest that he stay the night at their village. Junpei agrees and is guided down a rope ladder to a hut at the bottom of a sand dune, the home of a young woman. Junpei learns that she lost her husband and daughter in a sandstorm a year ago and now lives alone; their bodies are said to be buried under the sand somewhere near the hut. After dinner, the woman goes outside to shovel the sand into buckets, which the villagers reel in from the top of the dune. Junpei offers to help but she refuses, telling him that he is a guest and there is no need for him to help on the first day.

The next morning, Junpei gets ready to leave as he must return to his job in Tokyo, but finds that the rope ladder has been pulled up. Unable to escape as the sand surrounding the hut is too steep and does not give him enough grip to climb up, he quickly realises that he is trapped and expected to live with the woman and assist her in digging sand, which is sold to cement manufacturers, in exchange for food and water. Junpei begrudgingly accepts his role, which the woman has long accepted without question.

Junpei becomes the widow's lover but hopes to escape from the dune. One evening, using an improvised grappling hook, he escapes from the sand dune and runs away, the villagers in pursuit. Junpei is unfamiliar with the geography of the area and becomes trapped in quicksand. The villagers free him and return him to the hut.

Eventually, Junpei resigns himself to his situation but requests time to see the nearby sea; in exchange, he needs to have sex with the woman while the villagers watch. Junpei agrees but she refuses and fends him off. Through his persistent effort to trap a crow as a messenger, he discovers a way to draw water from the damp sand at night by capillary action and becomes absorbed in perfecting the technique. When it is discovered that the woman is ill from an ectopic pregnancy, the villagers take her to a doctor, leaving the rope ladder down when they go. Junpei instead chooses to stay, telling himself that he can still attempt to escape after showing the villagers his method of water production. The film's final shot is of a police report that shows that Junpei has been missing for seven years and declared as having disappeared.

Cast
 Eiji Okada as Niki Junpei, an amateur entomologist and school-teacher from Tokyo. Okada was cast in various Japanese films in the 1950s, but it was not until he appeared in Alain Resnais's 1959 film about the aftermath of the atomic bombing of Hiroshima that he gained a worldwide reputation. He has been in over 130 films in his lifetime, best known for his roles in Hiroshima Mon Amour (1959); Woman in the Dunes; and The Boy Detectives Club - The Iron Fiend (1957).
 Kyōko Kishida as the widow in the dunes. Kishida was a Japanese actress, voice actress, and writer of children's books. She was best known for Woman in the Dunes; Ninja, a Band of Assassins (1962); and An Autumn Afternoon (1962). She was a founding member of the theater group Engeki Shudan En (formed in 1975).
 Kōji Mitsui as the village elder who lures the entomologist to the widow's home. Mitsui was a popular character actor and favorite of Ozu and Kurosawa, well-remembered for his award-winning performance in the latter's The Lower Depths. The actor was billed above the film's title on the original Woman in the Dunes film poster, alongside Okada and Kishida, including the standard studio-era convention of appending his name with small characters indicating that Toho had borrowed the contracted player from Shochiku.

Production

Development

Prior to the production of Woman in the Dunes, Hiroshi Teshigahara directed , a.k.a. The Pitfall and Kashi To Kodomo, which was written by Kōbō Abe. Pitfall was Teshigahara's first feature, and the first of his four film collaborations with Abe and Takemitsu.

Technical details

With a run time of 123 minutes / 147 minutes (director's cut), the film was shot in 35 mm negative format by Hiroshi Segawa, the director of photography.

Location

Woman in the Dunes was shot on location at the Hamaoka sand dunes in Omaezaki, Shizuoka Prefecture, although many sources in English erroneously report that the film was shot in the Tottori sand dunes in Tottori Prefecture.

Release

The roadshow version of Woman in the Dunes was released in Japan on February 15, 1964 where it was distributed by Toho. The general release for Woman in the Dunes in Japan was April 18, 1964; the film was cut to 127 minutes.

The film was released in the United States by Pathe Contemporary Films with English subtitles on September 17, 1964. The film ran at 127 minutes. The film was also featured in the New York Film Festival on September 16, 1964.

The film was also featured in several other film festivals across the world such as the Cannes Film Festival in France, Adelaide Film Festival in Australia, and Clasicos del Cine Japones in Argentina on November 21, 2000.

The Criterion Collection released a DVD box set collecting Woman in the Dunes in its original length along with Teshigahara's Pitfall and The Face of Another in 2007. This release is now out of print. In August 2016, Criterion released the film as a stand-alone Blu-ray with a brand new high definition transfer.

Critical reception 
The film has a rating of 100% on review aggregator site Rotten Tomatoes, based on 27 critical reviews with an average rating of 8.5/10. It was one of Russian film-maker Andrei Tarkovsky's ten favorite movies.

Roger Ebert inducted Woman in the Dunes into his Great Movies list in 1998. Viewing the work as a retelling of the Sisyphus myth, he wrote, "There has never been sand photography like this (no, not even in "Lawrence of Arabia"), and by anchoring the story so firmly in this tangible physical reality, the cinematographer, Hiroshi Segawa, helps the director pull off the difficult feat of telling a parable as if it is really happening." Strictly Film School describes it as "a spare and haunting allegory for human existence". According to Max Tessier, the main theme of the film is the desire to escape from society.

The film's composer, Toru Takemitsu, was praised. Nathaniel Thompson wrote, "[Takemitsu's] often jarring, experimental music here is almost a character unto itself, insinuating itself into the fabric of the celluloid as imperceptibly as the sand." Ebert also stated that the score "doesn't underline the action but mocks it, with high, plaintive notes, harsh, like a metallic wind."

Awards 
The film won the Special Jury Prize at the 1964 Cannes Film Festival and, somewhat unusually for an avant-garde film, was nominated for the Best Foreign Language Film Oscar in the same year (losing to Yesterday, Today and Tomorrow). In 1965, Teshigahara was nominated for the Best Director Oscar (losing to Robert Wise for The Sound of Music). In 1967, the film won the Grand Prix of the Belgian Film Critics Association.

See also
 List of Japanese submissions for the Academy Award for Best Foreign Language Film
 List of submissions to the 37th Academy Awards for Best Foreign Language Film
 The House of Sand

References

Sources

External links
 
 
 
Woman in the Dunes: Shifting Sands an essay by Audie Bock at the Criterion Collection

1964 films
1964 drama films
1960s Japanese films
Best Film Kinema Junpo Award winners
Existentialist films
Films directed by Hiroshi Teshigahara
Films set on beaches
Films set in deserts
Films set in Tottori Prefecture
Japanese black-and-white films
Japanese drama films
1960s Japanese-language films
Films scored by Toru Takemitsu
Films shot in Japan